

History

Ancient
The Uí Laoghaire clan, today associated with the Uibh Laoghaire parish in County Cork, is considered by scholars to have originated in the early Middle Ages on the south-west coast, in the area of Ros Ó gCairbre (Rosscarbery), of which the O'Leary were hereditary lords.

The Annals of Innisfallen (Dublin copy) records St. Fachtna's (Saint Fachanan) death in 600 AD as occurring in "O'Laeghaire of Ross i.e. Corca Laidhe-I-Laeghaire Ruis". The clan traces its lineage to Lugaid Mac Con, an ancient King of Tara and High King of Ireland, and descendant of Dáire Doimthech. In the 12th century the O'Leary's were recognised hereditary wardens of St Fachtna's monastery and seat of higher learning, the School of Ross. In more recent times (since 1300 AD), the clan, of the Corcu Loígde, was pushed north and settled in an area south of Macroom around Inchigeelagh on the River Lee called Uibh Laoghaire (or Uibh Laoire in modern Irish – the 'gh' is silent in the old Irish). The Corcu Loígde were the rulers of Munster, and of territories beyond the province, before the rise of the Eóganachta in the 7th century. The port of Dún Laoghaire, near Dublin is not associated with the O'Leary sept(s), rather it is named for  Lóegaire mac Néill, a 5th-century High King of Ireland.

The book of Lecan (A.D. 1397-A.D. 1418) details the early status of O'Leary as a Corco Laide taisach duchusa (hereditary chieftain) in the tuath of Ross (Ruis), with associated families:Tuath Ruis .i. Tuath in Dolaich, o Loch in Bricin co Faid Ruis -, o Thraig Long co Sid na Fear (i) Find. O Leagaire a taisach duchusa. Is iad so an oclaid duchusa .i. O Ruaidri -, O Lonan -, O Laidid -, O Torpa -, O hUrmoltaich -, O Mirin -, O Meic Dairic -, O Tuaraide -, O Trena -, O hUainidi -, O Cerdin The name also occurs in the Cineal Laoghaire branch of the Eoghanacht dynasty which later came to dominate Munster.  With the unrelated Corco Laidhe and Eoghanacht branches of O'Learys settling in north-west Cork and nearby Kerry respectively, the tracing of lineage is complex.

Modern

Although almost nothing is known of their activities for several centuries, the O'Learys reappear as a still titled  family in the 16th century, and relatively wealthy, although they were subject to the MacCarthy of Muskerry dynasty, from whom they received the White Wand (a symbol of authority). They were the only other freeholders in Muskerry besides the O'Mahonys, and had built several castles in their territories, of which Carrignacurra is now the only one still standing. The celebrated Irish language writer Peadar Ua Laoghaire was a descendant of the Carrignacurra branch of the family.

Auliffe O'Leary joined the side of Hugh Ó Neill, 2nd Earl of Tyrone in the Nine Years' War, from the very inception of it, and took the field with William Bourke (Clanricarde) and others. For this the chiefs of the O'Learys were eventually attained, and their lands parceled out, but because of the remoteness of their territory it was never carried out, and they remained safe there until the Cromwellian confiscations decades later. Donough MacCarty, 1st Earl of Clancarty did however appear to do his best to allow them to stay on their lands through leasing. The family became much more scattered during the later Williamite War in Ireland.

As an example of their wealth and capacity in the mid-16th century, an early O'Leary of Carrignacurra  is purported to be the fosterer of Donnel na g croiceann, or Donnel of the Hides, ancestor of the modern O'Donovans of Clan Cahaill. His daughter Ellen married Donnell. Their issue was Donnell II O'Donovan.

The last O'Leary lord of the Old Gaelic order was Donal MacArt O'Leary (1575–1657).

People

Military
Art Ó Laoghaire (d 1773), Austro-Hungarian army officer
 His wife Eibhlín Dubh Ní Chonaill, composed "Caoineadh Airt Uí Laoghaire"
Daniel Florencio O'Leary (1802–1854), military general under Simon Bolivar
Michael John O'Leary (1890–1961), Irish-Canadian recipient of the Victoria Cross
William O'Leary (British Army officer), Deputy Commander Field Army (British Army)

Religion
Arthur O'Leary (preacher) (1729–1802), Irish Franciscan and polemical writer
Francis O'Leary MBE (1931–2000), founded the St Joseph's Hospice Association
Henry Joseph O'Leary (1879–1938), Bishop of Charlottetown and Archbishop of Edmonton
Louis James O'Leary (1877–1930), 6th Bishop of the Roman Catholic Diocese of Charlottetown

Poetry and literature
John O'Leary (Fenian) (1830–1907), Irish poet who was imprisoned in England
Máire Bhuí Ní Laoghaire (1774–1849), Irish poet
Peadar Ua Laoghaire (1839–1920), Irish writer in Irish and Catholic priest
P. I. O'Leary (1888–1944), Australian poet and journalist

Politics and law
Brendan O'Leary, Irish political scientist
Clement O'Leary, Canadian member of Parliament
Cornelius O'Leary, Irish historian and political scientist
Denis O'Leary (1863–1943), New York politician
Donnchadh Ó Laoghaire (born 1989) Teachta Dála for Sinn Féin
Grattan O'Leary (1888–1976), Canadian journalist and Senator
Hazel R. O'Leary (born 1937), former United States Secretary of Energy
Henry O'Leary, Irish-born businessman and political figure in New Brunswick
Hugh O'Leary (born 1974), English accountant and husband of Liz Truss
Humphrey O'Leary (1886–1953), 7th Chief Justice of New Zealand
James A. O'Leary, member of the United States House of Representatives from New York
Jean O'Leary, American gay and lesbian rights activist, politician, and former nun
John O'Leary (ambassador) (1947–2005), mayor of Portland, Maine, and United States ambassador to Chile
John O'Leary (Kerry politician) (born 1933), former Irish Fianna Fáil party politician and TD for Kerry South
John O'Leary (Wexford politician) (1894–1959), former Irish Labour party politician and TD for Wexford
Joseph V. O'Leary, NYS Comptroller 1941–1942 and founding member of the Liberal Party of New York
Kevin O'Leary (judge) (born 1920), 2nd Chief Justice of the Supreme Court of the Northern Territory
Michael O'Leary (politician) (1936–2006), former leader of the Irish Labour Party
Seán O'Leary (Irish politician) (born 1941), former Irish senator
William O'Leary (Irish politician) (died 1955), Irish Fianna Fáil politician and TD for Kerry

Journalism and activism
Émile-Dostaler O'Leary (1908–1965), Canadian journalist and writer
Grattan O'Leary (1888–1976), Canadian journalist and Senator
Jeremiah O'Leary, American journalist
John O'Leary (journalist), editor of the Times Higher Education Supplement
Olivia O'Leary, Irish journalist
P. I. O'Leary (1888–1944), Australian poet and journalist.
Walter-Patrice O'Leary (1910–1989), Canadian journalist, political activist and trade unionist

Arts and entertainment
Arthur O'Leary (composer) (1834–1919), Irish composer and pianist
Dermot O'Leary (born 1973), English television and radio presenter
Fletcher O'Leary, Australian child actor
Jane O'Leary (born 1946), American-Irish avantgarde composer
Karen O'Leary New Zealand comedian and television and film actress
Mary O'Leary (producer), American television producer
Matt O'Leary, American actor
Michael O'Leary (actor) (born 1958), in American soap opera Guiding Light
Patrick O'Leary (writer) (born 1952), American science fiction writer
Tim O'Leary, fictional character in the British soap opera Brookside
Ursula O'Leary, English actress
William O'Leary (actor), American actor

Sport
Amanda O'Leary, American lacrosse coach
Bob O'Leary, American soccer player
Charley O'Leary (1882–1941), American baseball player
Clare O'Leary, first Irish woman to climb Mount Everest
Clare O'Leary (cricketer)
Dan O'Leary, American baseball player
Daren O'Leary, English rugby union player
David O'Leary, English-born Irish football (soccer) manager formerly of Aston Villa
George O'Leary (born 1946), American college football coach
John O'Leary (Gaelic footballer)
Kieran O'Leary, Irish Gaelic footballer
Kristian O'Leary, Welsh football (soccer) player
Mike O'Leary, American curler
Noel O'Leary, Irish footballer
Peter O'Leary (referee), New Zealand football (soccer) referee
Pierce O'Leary, Irish footballer
Ryan O'Leary, Scottish footballer
Seánie O'Leary (born 1954), Irish hurler
Stephen O'Leary, English-born Irish footballer
Tomás O'Leary (born 1983), Irish rugby union player
Troy O'Leary (born 1969), American baseball player

Other
Brian O'Leary, American "scientist-astronaut"
Catherine O'Leary (1827–1895), owner of the property in which it was alleged the Great Chicago Fire started
Ciarán O'Leary, Irish professional poker player practicing in the USA
Daniel O'Leary (mobster), Irish American mobster
James Patrick O'Leary (c. 1860–1926), American mobster
Kevin O'Leary (entrepreneur), Canadian entrepreneur and venture capitalist
Michael O'Leary (Ryanair), CEO of the low-cost Irish airline Ryanair

Places
Dún Laoghaire, Dublin, Ireland – Name means "Fort of Leary".
O'Leary, Prince Edward Island
Plaza O’Leary – major square in Caracas, Venezuela. Named for Daniel Florencio O'Leary

See also
Leary (disambiguation)

References

Surnames
Irish families
Clíodhna